Miss World Sweden is a national Beauty pageant that has selected Sweden's representative to the Miss World, and Miss Earth pageant.

History

Firstly, Miss Sweden which ran from 1949 to 2003, by the female magazine VeckoRevyn and production company Strix in partnership with MTG. The competition qualified delegates to the global contest Miss World. As the competition stopped running, it was replaced by separate pageants with various franchises, but lost the franchise in 2003. The pageant was under sponsorship by Studio Fashion Inc and the marketing is made by the women's magazine Hänt Extra until 2020. After that the newly formed Miss Sweden pageant under the Miss Sweden Organization became the new sponsors/licenseholders with the main winner of Miss Sweden going to Miss World.

Sweden has the longest unbroken participation at the Miss World pageant, having appeared in almost every year since the first edition in 1951, with the exception of 2018. Many of the contestants have gone on to notable careers in television and film.

Controversies 
In the 1970 Miss World pageant, held in London, United Kingdom, controversy followed after the result was announced. Black contestant Jennifer Hosten of Grenada won, and black contestant Pearl Jansen of South Africa placed 1st Runner-Up, after which the BBC and newspapers received numerous protests about the result, and accusations of racism were made by all sides. Four of the nine judges had given first-place votes to Miss Sweden Marjorie Christel Johansson, while Miss Grenada received only two firsts, yet Johansson finished fourth. Since the Prime Minister of Grenada (then Premier), Sir Eric Gairy, was on the judging panel, inevitably there were many accusations that the contest had been rigged. Some of the audience gathered in the street outside Royal Albert Hall after the contest and chanted "Swe-den, Swe-den". Four days later, organising director Julia Morley (1941-) resigned because of the intense pressure from the newspapers. Years later, Johansson was reported as saying that she had been cheated out of the title.

Rita Rudolfsson Berntsson, at the 1972 Miss World pageant, created a mild sensation at the luncheon, where she wore a gown which had the flag of Sweden attached to her derrière. The crew were likely much more impressed with top front panel of her gown which barely covered the sides of her breasts. She was told to change the outfit.

Jennifer Palm Lundberg placed third runner-up in the national pageant, but won the title when each of the original top three placers declined the crown. This happened after arguments over the contract for the winner. It was revealed that the original winner was fired when her lawyer suggested her not to sign the contract written by the agency. The first and second runners-up each declined the crown for various reasons.

Titleholders

Miss World Sweden
Color key

The Miss World Sweden Organization was created in 2003 to focus more on the Miss World pageant.

Miss Sweden at Miss World

Miss Sweden which ran from 1949 to 2003, by the female magazine VeckoRevyn and production company Strix in partnership with MTG.

References

External links 
Miss World Sweden
Hänt Extra

Sweden
Beauty pageants in Sweden
Swedish awards
Television controversies in Sweden